The Central Wales Lineament is a north–south aligned zone of geological faults and folds which runs for scores of miles through Wales and which gives rise to a number of landscape features. The lineament lies along the axis of the Central Wales Syncline, both following the generally northeast–southwest Caledonide trend though its central section is more north–south aligned.

The Tafolog Fault which runs north from Llanbrynmair is one component structure in the central section of the lineament and along which Cwm Tafolog has been eroded. The Dylife Fault, a southerly continuation of the same fault is coincident with the valley of the Afon Twymyn. The section of the valley east of the former lead-mining village of Dylife is spectacularly incised into the landscape making this one of the most readily recognisable parts of the lineament. The lineament continues southwards as a series of offset north–south faults, crossing the Wye valley just west of Llangurig. The lineament continues south passing through the top end of Cwm Ystwyth where it meets the head of the Elan valley and then southwest where its main component is the Claerwen Fault

References

Geology of Wales